Trevor Beattie (born 24 December 1959) is a British advertising executive. He is a founding partner, chairman and creative director of Beattie McGuinness Bungay (BMB), and was formerly the chairman and creative director of TBWA London. Considered one of the leading figures in advertising in Britain, Beattie has been responsible for a number of high-profile and sometimes controversial advertising campaigns, most notably the "fcuk" campaign for French Connection and the 1994 Playtex Wonderbra campaign featuring Eva Herzigová. He has managed campaigns for the Labour Party, being a friend of Peter Mandelson and a supporter of New Labour. Beattie masterminded the ad campaigns for the Labour party in the 2001 and 2005 general elections.

Early life 
Beattie was one of eight children born to Jack and Ada Beattie in Birmingham, Warwickshire. His father, who was originally from Lisburn, County Down, worked as a car mechanic. The family lived in the Balsall Heath suburb of the city. Beattie was the first member of his family to enter into higher education, studying at Moseley School of Art, alongside UB40's Ali Campbell and Terence Wilson, and subsequently completing a degree in graphic design and photography at Wolverhampton Polytechnic.

Career 
In 2002 he was listed by Marketing magazine as the 9th Most Influential Person in Media and in 2003 was voted IPA Best of the Best Awards Creative Director of the Year.

In 2010 Beattie tried to win back the account from the Labour Party by spending over £12,000 of his own money fighting the Conservative Party in Wolverhampton but failed to unseat any of the eight politicians he was attacking.

February 8, 2011, Trevor was granted an Honorary Doctorate at the Birmingham City University.  Within his acceptance speech Trevor  announced he would offer a scholarship to forthcoming students in honor of his lecturer / teacher John Lowe.

New projects 
Beattie has also moved into the movie industry, producing the Bafta winning movie Moon, directed by Duncan Jones in 2008. He is also devising the marketing campaign for Richard Branson's Virgin Galactic Space Tourism Programme.

In November 2011 The Jack and Ada Beattie Foundation was launched. The Jack and Ada Beattie Foundation supports victims of social injustice by providing grants to both organisations and individuals under the themes of 'Dignity', 'Freedom' and 'Sanctuary'. The Foundation was set up in honour of Trevor Beattie's parents.

He has expressed interest in making a film on the life and career of Coronation Street actress Jean Alexander who played Hilda Ogden for nearly 25 years.

References

External links 

 
 Beattie McGuinness Bungay official website
 The Jack and Ada Beattie Foundation official website
 BBC: Trevor Beattie: Getting noticed, all right profile from April 2001

1959 births
Living people
Alumni of the University of Wolverhampton
British advertising executives
Businesspeople from Birmingham, West Midlands